General Charles Churchill (2 February 1656 – 29 December 1714) was a British Army officer who served during the War of the Spanish Succession and an English politician who sat in the English and British House of Commons from 1701 to 1710. He was a younger brother of John Churchill, 1st Duke of Marlborough and both his military and political careers were closely connected with his brother's. Along with Marlborough's Irish Chief of Staff William Cadogan, he was one of Churchill's closest advisors. He was a Tory, in contrast to his Whig brother who tolerated and possibly used Churchill's Tory connections.

Life
Churchill was the son of Winston Churchill and his wife Elizabeth Drake, daughter of Sir John Drake of Ashe, Devon, and his wife Helena Butler (or Boteler). He became a page and, from 1672 to 1708, a gentlemen in the household of Prince George of Denmark. He became Lieutenant of the Tower of London in 1702.

Charles Churchill joined the English Army as an ensign in the 3rd Regiment of Foot in 1674 and later received the colonelcy of that unit. He fought in numerous wars and battles, including Sedgemoor during Monmouth's Rebellion. He served under his brother when he captured Cork from its Jacobite Irish Army garrison in 1690. He then served on the continent at the Steenkerque and Landen. Churchill was promoted to brigadier-general in 1690 and to major-general in 1694.

Churchill was returned as Member of Parliament for Weymouth and Melcombe Regis in a contest at the first general election of 1701 and was blacklisted for opposing preparations for war with France. He was returned unopposed in the second general election of 1701 and supported Harley for the Speaker in January 1702, He supported the motion on 26 February 1702 to vindicate the Commons' proceedings in impeaching William's Whig ministers. In 1702, he became a lieutenant-general, at the same time receiving the colonelcy of the Coldstream Regiment of Foot Guards. He was returned unopposed as MP for Weymouth at the 1702 English general election. At Blenheim in 1704, he served under his elder brother John Churchill, 1st Duke of Marlborough, and commanded the center of the allied line. During the March to the Danube he oversaw the artillery and infantry contingents.  He was returned in a contest for Weymouth at the 1705 English general election. He supported the Court in the proceedings on the 'place clause' of the regency bill on 18 February 1706. At the battle of Ramillies, again serving under his brother, he ordered four brigades of foot to attack the village. He resigned his Lieutenancy of the Tower in 1706, and he served as Governor of Guernsey from 1706 to 1711. In 1707, he was made a full general. In late March 1708 onwards Churchill was 'seized with an apoplectic fit' but was non-the less returned as MP for Weymouth at the 1708 British general election. He suffered ongoing ill-health and began to drink heavily, and did not stand for Weymouth at the 1710 British general election.

Family
Churchill married Mary Gould, daughter of James Gould on 9 February 1702. She later married to Montagu Venables-Bertie, 2nd Earl of Abingdon). 
 
He was the father of Lieutenant-General Charles Churchill, by his mistress Elizabeth Dodd, and the grandfather of Charles Churchill, MP, by his son's mistress, the actress Anne Oldfield. His grandson married Lady Maria Walpole, illegitimate daughter of Robert Walpole, and had issue including Mary Churchill (2nd wife of the Earl Cadogan and ancestor of later earls). 

His sister was Arabella, a royal mistress of King James II of Great Britain, and his brother George became an admiral.

Notes

References

1656 births
1714 deaths
17th-century English people
British Army generals
Buffs (Royal East Kent Regiment) officers
British military personnel of the War of the Spanish Succession
Coldstream Guards officers
Lieutenants of the Tower of London
English MPs 1701–1702
English MPs 1702–1705
English MPs 1705–1707
British MPs 1707–1708
British MPs 1708–1710
Members of the Parliament of Great Britain for English constituencies
Charles
17th-century soldiers
Tory members of the Parliament of Great Britain